Kenneth L. Blakeney (born November 29, 1971) is an American basketball coach. He is the head coach of the Howard Bison men's basketball team.

Playing career
After a high school playing career at DeMatha Catholic High School under Morgan Wootten, where he was named the Gatorade Player of the Year in the state of Maryland, Blakeney played collegiately at Duke under Mike Krzyzewski where he was part of the Blue Devils' 1991 NCAA Championship season as a redshirting freshman, and the 1992 NCAA Championship season. He also served as team captain his senior year.

Coaching career
Upon graduating, Blakeney landed his first assistant coaching position under Lefty Driesell at James Madison, where he stayed for one season before another one-year stop at La Salle. Blakeney joined former Duke assistant coach Mike Brey's staff at Delaware, where he stayed from 1997 to 2001. During the 2001–02 season, Blakeney served as an assistant coach at Seton Hall before returning to Delaware for a second assistant coaching stint. In 2006, Blakeney became an assistant coach at Marshall before joining another former assistant coach from his playing days, working with Tommy Amaker at Harvard.

In 2011, Blakeney left coaching for the private sector, working at Under Armour in the company's marketing division. He returned to coaching in 2018, joining the staff at Columbia. On May 6, 2019, Blakeney was named the 10th head coach in Howard men's basketball history, replacing Kevin Nickelberry. Blakeney signed the top recruit in Howard history, Makur Maker, on July 3, 2020.

Head coaching record

References

1971 births
Living people
American men's basketball coaches
Basketball coaches from Washington, D.C.
Basketball players from Washington, D.C.
Columbia Lions men's basketball coaches
Delaware Fightin' Blue Hens men's basketball coaches
DeMatha Catholic High School alumni
Duke Blue Devils men's basketball players
Harvard Crimson men's basketball coaches
Howard Bison men's basketball coaches
James Madison Dukes men's basketball coaches
La Salle Explorers men's basketball coaches
Marshall Thundering Herd men's basketball coaches
Seton Hall Pirates men's basketball coaches